The dojo is a hybrid instrument designed as a cross between the Dobro-style guitar and the bluegrass banjo. The body and resonator are like the Dobro, while it is strung like a five-string banjo. The tunings and fingerings are also just like a banjo. The intention in creating the dojo was to give banjoists the opportunity to get a completely different sound without having to learn fingerings for an entirely new instrument. Dojos have a much more mellow sound than a banjo, and plucked notes are sustained longer due to the resonator.

References

Banjo family instruments
Resophonic instruments